The IAAF World Women's Road Race Championships was an annual international athletics championship in road running organised by the International Association of Athletics Federations (then known as the International Amateur Athletics Federation). It was contested from 1983 to 1991, before being replaced by the IAAF World Half Marathon Championships in 1992, an event for both men and women.

The event was a 10 km race in 1983 and 1984, then a 15 km race from 1985 to 1991.

Editions

Medalists

Individual

Team
Team medals were decided by adding the positions of the leading three team members, except in 1984, when the times of the three leading team members were added.

Individual Results

San Diego 1983 (10 km)
66 starters. 62 finishers

Madrid 1984 (10 km)
54 finishers.

Gateshead 1985 (15 km)
67 finishers.

Lisbon 1986 (15 km)
75 finishers.

Monte Carlo 1987 (15 km)
110 starters. 103 finishers.

Adelaide 1988 (15 km)
77 starters. 70 finishers.

Rio de Janeiro 1989 (15 km)
85 starters. 68 finishers.

Dublin 1990 (15 km)
83 starters. 77 finishers.

Nieuwegein 1991 (15 km)
70 finishers.

References 

 
Road Race, Women's
Defunct athletics competitions
Road Race Championships
10K runs
Recurring sporting events established in 1983
Recurring events disestablished in 1991
Women's athletics competitions
15K runs